Rosin is a German surname and a Jewish surname. Notable people with the surname include:

Carol Rosin (born 1944), American educator, author and aerospace executive
Charles Rosin (born 1952), American screenwriter and television producer
Daniel Rosin (born 1980), German footballer
David Rosin (1823–1894), German Jewish theologian
Dave Rosin (born 1981), Canadian musician
Hanna Rosin, American journalist

German-language surnames